Stara Gradiška is a village and a municipality in Slavonia, in the Brod-Posavina County of Croatia. It is located on the left bank of the river Sava, across from Gradiška in Bosnia and Herzegovina.

Etymology
The first word in the name means Old as there's also a New Gradiška nearby, the town of Nova Gradiška.

History

Until 1918, Stara Gradiška (then Alt-Gradiska) was part of the Habsburg monarchy (Kingdom of Croatia-Slavonia after the compromise of 1867), in the Croatia-Slavonia Military Border District. The post-office was opened in 1859.

In the late 19th and early 20th century, Stara Gradiška was part of the Požega County of the Kingdom of Croatia-Slavonia.

The place is well known for the Stara Gradiška prison and Stara Gradiška concentration camp. The municipality is home to the cultural organization KUD Posavina. It celebrates the feast of St. Michael as its municipal day. Stara Gradiška is underdeveloped municipality which is statistically classified as the First Category Area of Special State Concern by the Government of Croatia.

Demographics
The total population of the municipality is 1,363 (2011 census), distributed in the following settlements:
 Donji Varoš, population 284
 Gornji Varoš, population 258
 Gređani, population 173
 Novi Varoš, population 204
 Pivare, population 17
 Stara Gradiška, population 327
 Uskoci, population 100

References

Populated places in Brod-Posavina County
Slavonia
Bosnia and Herzegovina–Croatia border crossings
Municipalities of Croatia